Point 3 is the collective title of the third and fourth studio albums by British ambient dance band System 7. The first of the two is Point 3 – Fire Album; the second, Point 3 – Water Album. The two offer different mixes of the same material, Fire using more drums and rhythms, while Water is more ambient. Three tracks are unique: "Radiate" and "Overview" appear only on Fire; "Liquid Sky", only on Water.

The albums were released in the United States as a 2-CD set as System 7.3: Fire + Water by 777.

Track listing

Fire Album

Water Album

External links 

 Point 3 – Fire Album • discography on the official System 7 website
 Point 3 – Water Album • discography on the official System 7 website

1994 albums
System 7 (band) albums